Berthe di Vito-Delvaux (17 May 1915 – 2 April 2005) was a Belgian composer.

Biography
Berthe di Vito-Delvaux was born in Angleur, Belgium. She studied theory with Désiré Duysens, harmony with Louis Lavoye and piano with Jeanne House at the Royal Academy of Music of Liège, and composition under Léon Jongen at the Brussels Royal Academy of Music.

She married at eighteen, but completed her studies and then took a position teaching harmony at the Royal Academy of Music of Liège. 
In 1949, Berthe di Vito-Delvaux moved to Hasselt, and then in 1964 back to Angleur where she died in 2005.

Awards and honors
Di Vito-Delvaux received honors and awards including: 
Maria Prize from the City of Liège 1938
Prix de Rome in 1943
Composition prize from the province of Limburg 1952
Modeste Grétry Prize from Société d'Auteurs Belge – Belgische Auteurs Maatschappi (SABAM) in 1962
Consecration Prize from the Province of Liège in 1978.

Works
Di Vito-Delvaux composed ballets, opera, and theatrical works, as well as works for orchestra, chamber ensemble, voice and instruments. Selected works include:

Sonata for horn and piano, Op. 109
A Jacqueline op. 157, 1985 for violin and piano
Abandon op. 169, 1988 for mezzo-soprano and piano
Abigaïl op. 45, 1950 opera
Abigaïl: Air de Hugo op. 45, 1950 for tenor and piano
Adagio op. 68, 1954 for cello and piano
Airs à danser op. 48, 1950 for orchestra
Airs à danser op. 49, 1951 for piano
Sonata for viola and piano, Op. 60, 1955
Amours païennes op. 24, 1943 for tenor, soprano, women's choir and orchestra
Ariane et Bacchus/Bacchantes op. 24, 1943 for orchestra
Au long du chemin for women's choir a cappella
Concerto, Op. 120 1969
Grétry comic opera, Op. 137

Her compositions have been recorded and issued on CD including:
Berthe di Vito-Delvaux (1915-2005) Chamber Music: Works for Voice and Wind Instruments, Audio CD, Quartziade

References

External links
Full list of works

1915 births
2005 deaths
20th-century classical composers
Belgian music educators
Women classical composers
Belgian classical composers
Belgian opera composers
Musicians from Liège
Women opera composers
Women music educators
20th-century women composers